Fernand Émile Canelle (2 January 1882 – 11 September 1951) was a French footballer. He was born in Paris and after training with English club Norwood and Selhurst FC, started his career in 1896 with Club Français. At the 1900 Summer Olympics, he won a silver medal. He made six appearances for the France national team from 1904 to 1908.
According to Reeves, captain of the Norwood and Selhurst Football Club interviewed in October 1900, he was one of the best French forwards.

References

External links

 
 

1882 births
1951 deaths
Footballers from Paris
French footballers
France international footballers
Association football defenders
Olympic footballers of France
Olympic silver medalists for France
Footballers at the 1900 Summer Olympics
Club Français players
Olympic medalists in football
Medalists at the 1900 Summer Olympics